Godfree is a surname. Notable people with the surname include: 

Douglas Godfree (1881–1929), British fencer and modern pentathlete
Grainne Godfree, American television writer
Guy Godfree, Canadian cinematographer
Leslie Godfree (1885–1971), British male tennis player
Kathleen McKane Godfree (1896–1992), British tennis and badminton player
Leslie Godfree (1885–1971), British tennis player